Sodium/potassium-transporting ATPase subunit beta-1 is an enzyme that in humans is encoded by the ATP1B1 gene.

The protein encoded by this gene belongs to the family of Na+/K+ and H+/K+ ATPases beta chain proteins, and to the subfamily of Na+/K+-ATPases. Na+/K+-ATPase is an integral membrane protein responsible for establishing and maintaining the electrochemical gradients of Na and K ions across the plasma membrane. These gradients are essential for osmoregulation, for sodium-coupled transport of a variety of organic and inorganic molecules, and for electrical excitability of nerve and muscle. This enzyme is composed of two subunits, a large catalytic subunit (alpha) and a smaller glycoprotein subunit (beta). The beta subunit regulates, through assembly of alpha/beta heterodimers, the number of sodium pumps transported to the plasma membrane. The glycoprotein subunit of Na+/K+-ATPase is encoded by multiple genes. This gene encodes a beta 1 subunit. Alternatively spliced transcript variants encoding different isoforms have been identified.

References

Further reading

External links